Events from the year 1225 in Ireland.

Incumbent
Lord: Henry III

Events

Dominican Order founds the 'Black Abbey', lying just off Parliament Street in Kilkenny.

Births

Deaths

References

 
1220s in Ireland
Ireland
Years of the 13th century in Ireland